, also known as Doraemon's Parallel Journey to the West, is a 1988 Japanese animated science fantasy film which premiered on March 12, 1988 in Japan. It is loosely based on the 16th-century novel Journey to the West. It is the 9th Doraemon film and last Showa-era Doraemon.

Plot
The film begins with Nobita waking up after seeing a dream where he impersonates the Stone Monkey and Doraemon, a traveler from the Western dynasty. He wakes midst his friends practicing a school play, Journey to the West. At the end, he promises to find the actual Sun Wukong and if he is unable to do so, Gian can use any gadget of Doraemon. At home, unable to find Doraemon– who is enjoying a virtual video game– Nobita travels to 645 AD where he notices Sun Wukong resembling his face and later helping a white starving kid whom he helps. Hours later, he also brings along his friends with Doraemon after which they are prevented by an uprising cavalry. They later spot Tang Seng after which Doraemon disguises Nobita as Stone Monkey through the game. During some talks, a monster secretly cradles out of the game.

After losing his bet, Nobita and his friends return home. Gian asks for the video game and the group starts playing it, but there were no monsters in the game. Doraemon says that there might be a problem in the functioning and Gian, Shizuka and Suneo return to their homes. They find the atmosphere to be extremely dark. At night, Nobita sees that his father has horns but he thinks that he is just seeing things.

The next day, when they were rehearsing, Dekisugi says that Shizuka (playing the role of Tang Seng) will be eaten by the monsters. The group opposes him saying that this is not the story. But slowly, Dekisugi gets angry and develops horns, seeing which the group gets shocked. Their teacher arrives, and when the group complains about the matter, the Teacher gets angry and turns into a monster. As soon as Nobita reaches home, he and Doraemon, using Bamboo Copters, set out to survey the city and they find a huge Chinese-styled building and Doraemon realizes that the monsters from the game came out when they left the machine open, yesterday, when they went to 645 AD, where the monsters came out from the machine and the course of history changed. To stop the growth and rule of monsters, the friends decide to travel back to fix things. They disguise as their respective characters and travel back in time.

Upon reaching, the camera pans upon to Tang Seng along with the white kid, resting in a temple. After two monsters and their pets attack Tang Seng, Nobita disguised as Stone Monkey defeats them along with Doraemon and his friends. Tang Seng leaves them for his journey and the friends head forward to eliminate all monsters in Tang-Seng's way but they get exhausted and open a camping capsule during the  route where they relax. At night, Tang-Seng awakes to peep the white kid whispering to a monster, but ignores and falls asleep.

The next dawn, a flock of monster-bats carry Tang-Seng towards the castle whereas the white kid lives. Gian advises Nobita to take a look at Tang-Seng. As he moves, he passes by a past Nobita who identifies him Sun Wukong. He stops by a lake and notices the castle hosting Tang-Seng. After trying to save Tang-Seng, he is attacked by the monsters of the castle. Back at the desert, the friends help defeat Silverhorn but Shizuka is secretly kidnapped by a monster underground. The white kid apologizes and leads the friends inside the castle. While reaching the main gate, the friends fall off in a hole behind the white kid. They wake up and are reunited with Shizuka and Tang-Seng but tied with ropes.

Though Tang-Seng forgives the white kid, who is actually the son of the Monstress of the Castle, the Monstress orders the King of Monsters to eat the group. However, before dipping Doraemon in acid, Dorami arrives to rescue him and the white kid secretly releases all the friends. Nobita struggles initially, but later, magnifies his stick which pierces through the Monster King, leading to the Monster's death and so the magic fades off and the Montress also falls in the lava. As the volcano begins to shake, the friends take the help of Anywhere Door which directs them to a nearby land as they watch the volcano erupt. Nobita secrets his original identity as the friends bid farewell to Tang-Seng who heads for his further journey.

Upon returning home, Nobita suspects his mother, but is relieved when he finds no horns. The friends smile as Nobita and his mother embrace. As the credits roll up, the theme song plays, while the friends happily reunite with their mothers.

Cast

Release
The film was released in Japan on 12 March 1988.

References

External links 
 Doraemon The Movie 25th page 
 

1988 films
Nobita's Parallel "Journey to the West"
1988 anime films
1980s children's animated films
Japanese children's fantasy films
Films based on Journey to the West
Animated films about time travel
Films directed by Tsutomu Shibayama
Films scored by Shunsuke Kikuchi
Buddhist animation